Fuhlsbüttel is a station on the Hamburg U-Bahn line U1. It was opened in July 1921 and is located in Hamburg, Germany, in the quarter of Fuhlsbüttel. Fuhlsbüttel is part of the borough of Hamburg-Nord.

History 
The station was opened in July 1921, after the Langenhorn railway was in preliminary operation with steam trains since 5 January 1918. The steam trains then used the track of the freight railway from Ohlsdorf to Ochsenzoll, which was located east of the U-Bahn tracks. It was used until 1991 and removed in 2008. In 1990 the station was fully renovated, and a lift was added then.

Station layout
The station is located in a terrain cutting with an island platform and two tracks. The station is fully accessible for handicapped persons, as there is a lift.

Service

Trains
Fuhlsbüttel is served by Hamburg U-Bahn line U1; departures are every 5 minutes, every 10 minutes in non-busy periods. Bus lines 118, 174, and night bus line 607 have a stop in front of the station.

See also

 List of Hamburg U-Bahn stations

References

External links 

 Line and route network plans at hvv.de 

Hamburg U-Bahn stations in Hamburg
U1 (Hamburg U-Bahn) stations
Buildings and structures in Hamburg-Nord
Railway stations in Germany opened in 1921